Ed, Eddie or Edward Horton may refer to:

Edward Everett Horton (1886–1970), American character actor
Eddie Horton (1893—after 1932), Australian organist at Sydney's Prince Edward Theatre
Edward Austin Horton (1908–1980), Canadian politician, first mayor of Etobicoke, Ontario
Edward Raymond Horton (1928–1977), New Zealand murderer
Ed Horton (born 1967), American basketball power forward

See also
Edmund Horton (1896–1944), American Olympic bobsledder